Ogba (also Olu Ogba, mobu onu Ogbah) is an Igboid language spoken by Ogba people of Nigeria.

Writing system

Certain digraphs and trigraphs are also used.

The tones are indicated with diacritics:
 the high tone is indicated by the absence of a diacritic: ;
 the low tone is indicated with the grave accent :  ;
 the falling tone is indicated with the circumflex accent :  ;
 the downstep is indicated with the macron : .

References

Igboid languages
Indigenous languages of Rivers State